In mathematics, a Hughes plane is one of the non-Desarguesian projective planes found by .
There are examples of order p2n for every odd prime p and every positive integer n.

Construction
The construction of a Hughes plane is based on a nearfield N of order p2n for p an odd prime whose kernel K has order pn and coincides with the center of N.

Properties
A Hughes plane H:
 is a non-Desarguesian projective plane of odd square prime power order of Lenz-Barlotti type I.1,
 has a Desarguesian Baer subplane H0,
 is a self-dual plane in which every orthogonal polarity of H0 can be extended to a polarity of H,
 every central collineation of H0 extends to a central collineation of H, and
 the full collineation group of H has two point orbits (one of which is H0), two line orbits, and four flag orbits.

The smallest Hughes Plane (order 9)
The Hughes plane of order 9 was actually found earlier by Veblen and Wedderburn in 1907. A construction of this plane can be found in  where it is called the plane Ψ.

Notes

References
 

 

Projective geometry
Finite geometry